Quelcata (possibly from Aymara qillqaña to write, -ta a suffix to indicate the participle, "written" or "something written") is a mountain in the Huanzo mountain range in the Andes of Peru, about  high. It is located in the Condesuyos Province, Cayarani District, and in the La Unión Province, Puyca District. Quelcata lies southeast of the mountain Pillune, southwest of the mountain Ancojahua and east of the mountain Chuañuma.

References

Mountains of Peru
Mountains of Arequipa Region